Grand Master Hong Sung-chon (May 3, 1945) is an early proponent of Taekwondo in the Philippines. Many filipino champions, such as Monsour Del Rosario, Samuel Morrison, Jordan Dominguez and Elaine Alora have been produced under his tutelage. He is a director of the Kukiwon's List of Grand Masters. He is the Vice-President of the Philippine Taekwondo Association.

References

External links 
Igorot champion Dominguez thanks GM Hong
Monsour del Rosario, Olympian Stephen Fernandez expected to grace DELTA's 40th year
Master Monsour under GM Hong's tutelage
Elections in Taekwondo Committee
Taekwondo in its early stage

Taekwondo in the Philippines
South Korean expatriates in the Philippines
Living people
South Korean male taekwondo practitioners
1945 births